Luis "Lou" Sagastume is a retired Guatemalan-American soccer player who spent three seasons in the North American Soccer League and coached at the youth, collegiate and professional levels.  He was the head coach of the Air Force Falcons for 28 years before retiring in 2009

Player

Youth
While born in Guatemala, Sagastume grew up in northern California and graduated from Lincoln High School.  He attended the University of San Francisco where he was a midfielder on the men's soccer team from 1964 to 1967.  He was team captain his junior and senior seasons and was a 1966 Second Team All American, the same year the Dons won the NCAA Men's Soccer Championship.  He graduated in 1968 and was inducted into the Dons Hall of Fame in 1974.

Professional
In 1968, the Oakland Clippers of the North American Soccer League signed Sagastume, but he saw no first team games during his two seasons with them.  In 1975, he became a player-coach with the San Antonio Thunder of the NASL.

Coach
In 1964, Sagastume began his coaching career as the head coach of the St. Ignatius College Preparatory boys' soccer team.  In 1967, Sagastume became the head coach of the University of San Francisco junior varsity soccer team.  Over two seasons, the Dons JV team ran to a 30–2 record.  In 1974, he moved to Cal State Chico as an assistant coach and remained there for four seasons.  In 1975, he was a player-coach with the San Antonio Thunder of the North American Soccer League.  In 1977, he returned to St. Ignatius to coach the boys' team for two more seasons.  In 1978, while he was coaching St. Ignatius, San Francisco State hired Sagastume as head coach of the men's soccer team.  Over two seasons, his teams went 22–8.  In 1980, he became the head coach of the United States Air Force Academy men's soccer team.  He compiled a 303–196–43 with the Falcons before retiring on April 10, 2007.  In the fall of 2007, he became the coach of the St. Mary's High School soccer team.

In 2009, Sagastume was inducted into the San Francisco State Gators Hall of Fame.

References

External links
 NASL stats

Air Force Falcons men's soccer coaches
American soccer coaches
American soccer players
Colorado Springs Switchbacks FC coaches
Guatemalan emigrants to the United States
Guatemalan footballers
North American Soccer League (1968–1984) coaches
North American Soccer League (1968–1984) players
San Antonio Thunder players
San Francisco Dons men's soccer coaches
San Francisco Dons men's soccer players
Soccer players from California
Living people
Association football defenders
Association football midfielders
Year of birth missing (living people)
Oakland Clippers players
Chico State Wildcats men's soccer coaches
Association football player-managers
San Francisco State Gators men's soccer coaches
High school soccer coaches in the United States